A Escola is a Portuguese-language novel by Miguel M. Abrahão. It was first published in Brazil in 1983.

Plot summary
The book has as background the 30s, during the dictatorship of the Vargas government.

Master Bolivar Bueno, involved with dangerous ideas for the season, has a strong influence and emotional control over their traditional primary school students from Wolfgang Schubert, while dividing her love  life with the teachers of the school, ideologically and being chased by the director, the Rev. Otto Faukner, and his assistant, miss Catarina.

In 2005, the play was adapted by its author to the format of the novel, released in 2007.
In this new format, the author expands historical themes, importants for the knowledge of Brazilian History of the 30s: Revolution to São Paulo in 1932, fascism and communism in Brazil, ruled by Getúlio Vargas.

Bibliography
 Coutinho, Afrânio; Sousa, J. Galante de. Enciclopédia de literatura brasileira. São Paulo: Global; Rio de Janeiro: Fundação Biblioteca Nacional, Academia Brasileira de Letras, 2001: 2v.
 Sociedade Brasileira de Autores Teatrais - Processo 36030 de 19 October 1983

External links
 Brazilian Society of playwrights
 A Escola at the Encyclopedia of Theatre
  A Escola at Google books

Notes

2007 novels
Brazilian romance novels
Brazilian historical novels
Brazilian plays
Fiction set in the 1930s
Novels set in São Paulo